Michelin Guide Toronto was launched in 2022.

History
The guide was initiated through a marketing partnership between Destination Toronto and Michelin, similar to other cities the guide has entered in recent years.

The guide was to launch in 2020, but delayed by the COVID-19 pandemic.

Recipients
All restaurants listed are from the 2022 guide.

Two stars
 Sushi Masaki Saito

One star
 Aburi Hana
 Alo
 Alobar Yorkville
 Don Alfonso 1890
 Edulis
 Enigma Yorkville
 Frilu
 Kaiseki Yu-Zen Hashimoto
 Osteria Guilia
 Quetzal
 Shoushin
 Yukashi

Bib Gourmand
 The Ace
 Alma
 Bar Raval
 Campechano
 Cherry St BBQ
 Chica’s Chicken
 Fat Pasha
 Enoteca Sociale
 Favorites Thai
 Fonda Balama
 Grey Gardens
 Indian Street Food Company
 La Bartola
 R&D
 Puerto Bravo
 Sumilicious Smoked Meat & Deli
 Wynona

Criticism
The launch of the guide has attracted criticique from various outlets including BBC News, suggesting that the guide is not representative of the diversity of Toronto's food scene, or that the city doesn't need outside recognition.

References

External links
 "2022 Toronto MICHELIN Stars", Michelin Guide, 13 September 2022.

Buildings and structures in Toronto
Michelin Guide starred restaurants
Michelin Guide
Michelin starred restaurants in Toronto
Toronto cuisine